Crawley College is a college of further education in West Sussex. It offers courses ranging from Sixth form and Adult education to undergraduate courses through partnerships with universities.

History
Crawley College was formed in 2017 after a merger between Central Sussex College with Chichester College. Central Sussex College was formed in August 2005 from a merger of Crawley College and Haywards Heath College.

Crawley College
Crawley College of Further Education was opened in 1958  by West Sussex County Council at the campus in Crawley town centre. The college offers many technical courses, particularly in engineering fields, and was later known as Crawley College of Technology from 1977 until 1989.

Haywards Heath College
Haywards Heath Grammar School opened on 9 September 1958, being run by East Sussex Education Committee with 800 boys and girls. It became a sixth form college. Haywards Heath College was established in 1980 and offered mainly courses for 16- to 18-year-old students following on from compulsory education.

History of Central Sussex College

Central Sussex College had five campuses across the county, offering a variety of services at each, and a commercial training centre in Horsham, Horsham Training Centre.

 The Crawley campus at College Road, Crawley, offered a variety of technical and professional courses, including engineering, hair and beauty services, food, information technology and construction. It was the largest of the campuses  as well as being the centre through which undergraduate courses are undertaken in partnership with the University of Chichester and the University of Sussex.  Crawley College's College Road campus is the tallest building in Crawley at 11 storeys.
 The Haywards Heath campus at Harlands Road in the west of the town, north of Dolphin Leisure Centre. It offered mainly post-compulsory courses such as Advanced level courses and BTECs. The campus attracted mainly students in the 16-18 age bracket.
 There were two campuses in East Grinstead at Queensmere House in the town centre offering many adult education and IT-based courses, as well as a beauty salon, and at the Birches Industrial Estate where there was a vocational centre working in partnership with the local secondary schools.
 The final campus at the Victoria Business Centre in Burgess Hill provided vocational training in brickwork, plumbing, electrical installation, welding and motor vehicle engineering.
 Horsham Training Centre in Hurst Road, Horsham, was a professional training centre for adults offering one day and short courses including IT, leadership and management, health and safety and business skills.

Central Sussex College has closed two of their campuses due to a £25 million debt. The East Grinstead campus closed in the summer of 2016 and the Haywards Heath campus closed in the summer of 2017. There had also been discussions about selling of one of the rear car parks in the Crawley campus in order to pay off some of the debt.

In 2017 it was revealed that Central Sussex College was looking at merging with Chichester College; the idea was welcomed by both colleges. In an interview with S. Wright and S. Legrave (the Central Sussex College Principal and the Chichester College Principal) they said "We believe that a merger between our colleges will create opportunities around financial sustainability and ensure a diverse and employer led curriculum to meet local business and community needs...We remain committed to ensuring quality teaching and learning and believe that collaboration provides the opportunity to grow income, share costs and work in broader geographical areas." during the summer of 2017 the merger took place, Central Sussex College, in Crawley was renamed "Crawley College", the same name it had when it was during it last merger in 2005.

2021 shooting
On 26 April 2021 after 3 pm, shots were heard and the college was evacuated. Two members of staff had suffered minor injuries, one being shot at with blanks and the other being stabbed in the hand. Armed police swept the campus and found nothing with roads being block and a large police presence of over 100 officers some from armed units of the Metropolitan Police. Police found a knife and a firearm when they arrested an 18-year-old man near the college.

Enterprise
The college has trainee hairdressing, beauty salons, and a restaurant open to the public. These allow students to train with real customers.

Intuition is the brand name for the college's trainee hairdressing and beauty salons at Crawley

Notable alumni

Crawley College of Further Education
 Liz Byrski, journalist

Crawley College of Technology
 Michael Dempsey, bass guitarist of The Cure from 1977 to 1979
 Laura Moffatt, Labour MP from 1997 to 2010 for Crawley

Haywards Heath College
 Brett Anderson and Mat Osman of the band Suede
 Mathew Bose, actor

Haywards Heath Grammar School
 Tim Godwin OBE, Deputy Commissioner of Police of the Metropolis since 2009
 Anne Milton, Conservative MP for Guildford since 2005
 Philip Payton, Professor of Cornish and Australian Studies at the University of Exeter
 Greta Scacchi (briefly), actress

References

External links
 
 
 EduBase
 Merger in 2005

Buildings and structures in Crawley
Further education colleges in Sussex
Educational institutions established in 1958
1958 establishments in England